The 19th Washington D.C. Area Film Critics Association Awards were announced on February 8, 2021.

Winners and nominees

Best Film
 Nomadland
 First Cow
 Minari
 One Night in Miami...
 Promising Young Woman

Best Director
 Chloé Zhao – Nomadland
 Lee Isaac Chung – Minari
 Emerald Fennell – Promising Young Woman
 Regina King – One Night in Miami...
 Kelly Reichardt – First Cow

Best Actor
 Chadwick Boseman – Ma Rainey's Black Bottom as Levee Green
 Riz Ahmed – Sound of Metal as Ruben Stone
 Anthony Hopkins – The Father as Anthony
 Delroy Lindo – Da 5 Bloods as Paul
 Steven Yeun – Minari as Jacob Yi

Best Actress
 Frances McDormand – Nomadland as Fern
 Viola Davis – Ma Rainey's Black Bottom as Ma Rainey
 Vanessa Kirby – Pieces of a Woman as Martha Weiss
 Elisabeth Moss – The Invisible Man as Cecilia Kass
 Carey Mulligan – Promising Young Woman as Cassandra "Cassie" Thomas

Best Supporting Actor
 Leslie Odom, Jr. – One Night in Miami... as Sam Cooke
 Sacha Baron Cohen – The Trial of the Chicago 7 as Abbie Hoffman
 Daniel Kaluuya – Judas and the Black Messiah as Fred Hampton
 Bill Murray – On the Rocks as Felix Keane
 Paul Raci – Sound of Metal as Joe

Best Supporting Actress
 Youn Yuh-jung – Minari as Soon-ja
 Maria Bakalova – Borat Subsequent Moviefilm as Tutar Sagdiyev
 Olivia Colman – The Father as Anne
 Dominique Fishback – Judas and the Black Messiah as Deborah Johnson
 Amanda Seyfried – Mank as Marion Davies

Best Original Screenplay
 Emerald Fennell – Promising Young Woman
 Lee Isaac Chung – Minari
 Darius Marder and Abraham Marder (story by Darius Marder and Derek Cianfrance) – Sound of Metal
 Andy Siara – Palm Springs
 Aaron Sorkin – The Trial of the Chicago 7

Best Adapted Screenplay
 Chloé Zhao – Nomadland
 Charlie Kaufman – I'm Thinking of Ending Things
 Kemp Powers – One Night in Miami...
 Jonathan Raymond and Kelly Reichardt – First Cow
 Ruben Santiago-Hudson – Ma Rainey's Black Bottom

Best Animated Feature
 Soul
 The Croods: A New Age
 Onward
 Over the Moon WolfwalkersBest Documentary Film
 Boys State Collective Crip Camp Dick Johnson Is Dead TimeBest International/Foreign Language Film
 Another Round Bacurau La Llorona The Mole Agent Night of the KingsBest Cinematography
 Joshua James Richards – Nomadland
 Erik Messerschmidt – Mank Newton Thomas Sigel – Da 5 Bloods Hoyte van Hoytema – Tenet Dariusz Wolski – News of the WorldBest Editing
 Jennifer Lame – Tenet
 Alan Baumgarten – The Trial of the Chicago 7 Kirk Baxter – Mank Mikkel E. G. Nielsen – Sound of Metal Chloé Zhao – NomadlandBest Original Score
 Jon Batiste, Trent Reznor, and Atticus Ross – Soul
 Ludwig Göransson – Tenet James Newton Howard – News of the World Emile Mosseri – Minari Trent Reznor and Atticus Ross – MankBest Production Design
 Donald Graham Burt (production design) and Jan Pascale (set decoration) – Mank
 David Crank (production design) and Elizabeth Keenan (set decoration) – News of the World Nathan Crowley (production design) and Kathy Lucas (set decoration) – Tenet Kave Quinn (production design) and Stella Fox (set decoration) – Emma Mark Ricker (production design) and Karen O'Hara (set decoration) – Ma Rainey's Black BottomBest Acting Ensemble
 One Night in Miami... Da 5 Bloods Ma Rainey's Black Bottom Minari The Trial of the Chicago 7Best Youth Performance
 Alan Kim – Minari as David Yi
 Millie Bobby Brown – Enola Holmes as Enola Holmes
 Sidney Flanigan – Never Rarely Sometimes Always as Autumn Callaghan
 Talia Ryder – Never Rarely Sometimes Always as Skylar
 Helena Zengel – News of the World as Johanna Leonberger

Best Voice Performance
 Jamie Foxx – Soul as Joe Gardner
 Tina Fey – Soul as 22
 Tom Holland – Onward as Ian Lightfoot
 Honor Kneafsey – Wolfwalkers as Robyn Goodfellowe
 Octavia Spencer – Onward as Corey

The Joe Barber Award for Best Portrayal of Washington, D.C.
 Wonder Woman 1984 Crip Camp The Fight Jimmy Carter: Rock & Roll President John Lewis: Good Trouble''

Multiple nominations and wins

The following films received multiple nominations:

The following films received multiple awards:

References

External links
 The Washington D.C. Area Film Critics Association

2020
2020 film awards